Hebrus buenoi, or Bueno's velvet water bug, is a species of velvet water bug in the family Hebridae. It is found in Central America and North America.

Subspecies
These two subspecies belong to the species Hebrus buenoi:
 Hebrus buenoi buenoi Drake & Harris, 1943
 Hebrus buenoi furvus J. Polhemus & Chapman, 1970

References

Further reading

 

Articles created by Qbugbot
Insects described in 1943
Hebroidea